"The Chicken in Black" is a song written by Gary Gentry and originally recorded by Johnny Cash.

Released as a single in 1984 (Columbia 38-04513, with "Battle of Nashville" on the opposite side), the song reached number 45 on U.S. Billboard country chart.

Cash was initially optimistic and pleased with the recording. However Cash later renounced the song and in his second autobiography called it "intentionally atrocious" after close friends and family reacted poorly to the video and song. June Cash called the song the "nadir" of his 1980s career.

Lyrics
A humorous story song, the lyrics relate how Cash visits his doctor due to persistent headaches and is told that his body has "outlived [his] brain". The doctor performs a brain transplant on Cash, replacing his brain with that of a dead bank robber.  When Cash visits a bank, however, his new brain compels him to rob it, and when he performs at the Grand Ole Opry some time later, he robs the audience of their valuables.  He calls his doctor and demands his old brain back, but the doctor informs him that it has been transplanted into a chicken.  The song ends with Cash warning his friends that if they meet him he might rob them and noting that if they have ten dollars spare they "ought to catch that Johnny Chicken Show".

Track listing

Charts

References

External links 
 "The Chicken in Black" on the Johnny Cash official website

Johnny Cash songs
1984 songs
1984 singles
Songs written by Gary Gentry (songwriter)
Columbia Records singles